Grigg is a lunar impact crater that is located on the far side of the Moon. It lies in the northern outskirts of the huge walled plain Hertzsprung, to the southwest of the crater Fersman and southeast of Poynting. The rim of this crater is generally circular, with a small impact crater intruding into the eastern edge. A small crater fills the northwestern part of the interior floor.

Satellite craters
By convention these features are identified on lunar maps by placing the letter on the side of the crater midpoint that is closest to Grigg.

References

 
 
 
 
 
 
 
 
 

Impact craters on the Moon